Euexorista is a genus of flies in the family Tachinidae.

Species
E. rebaptizata (Gosseries, 1989)

References

Diptera of North America
Exoristinae
Tachinidae genera
Taxa named by Charles Henry Tyler Townsend